USS LSM-149 was a  built for the U.S. Navy in World War II. Like most ships of her class, she was not named and known only by her designation.

LSM-149 was laid down at the Charleston Navy Yard on 4 May 1944, and was launched 27 May 1944. She was commissioned along with sister ship  on 8 July 1944 by Rear Admiral Jules James. 

Assigned to the Pacific Theatre, LSM-149 was damaged and breached while attempting to recover a barge in heavy surf off Sansapor, New Guinea on 30–31 July 1944.  LSM-149 was grounded off the Philippines on 5 December 1944. (According to the United States Navy this happened on 14 December 1944, but her fate has also been reported as on 5 December 1944.) She was declared a total loss, and decommissioned on 15 April 1945.

References

 

Ships built in Charleston, South Carolina
World War II amphibious warfare vessels of the United States
World War II shipwrecks in the Pacific Ocean
1944 ships
LSM-1-class landing ships medium
Maritime incidents in December 1944